Stane Potočar (27 April 1919 – 5 December 1997) was a Slovenian general of the Yugoslav People's Army (JNA), who served as the Chief of the General Staff of the JNA from 15 October 1972 to 10 July 1979.

References

Literature

1919 births
1997 deaths
People from Lower Carniola
People of the Kingdom of Yugoslavia
Chiefs of Staff of the Yugoslav People's Army
Yugoslav Partisans members
Slovenian generals
Generals of the Yugoslav People's Army
League of Communists of Yugoslavia politicians
Recipients of the Order of the People's Hero